Johann Gudenus or Johann Baptist Björn Graf von Gudenus  (born 20 July 1976) is a former Austrian politician who served as a deputy leader of the Freedom Party.

Early life 
Born into the noble Gudenus family, he is the second born son of FPÖ politician John Graf von Gudenus and his wife, Marie Louise Bilogan (born 1951), daughter of Austrian Oberst Leopold Bilogan (1912–1995). He has three brothers.

Politics 
Following the Ibiza affair, Gudenus resigned from all political posts in May 2019.

Personal life 
In 2016 he married Serbian Tajana Tajčić. They have one son and a daughter, Anastasia Marie Louise. Johann also has a son from his first marriage.

See also

References 

Living people
1976 births
Freedom Party of Austria politicians
Politicians from Vienna